William Aloysius Scully (August 6, 1894 – January 5, 1969) was an American prelate of the Roman Catholic Church. He served as Bishop of Albany from 1954 until his death in 1969.

Biography
William Scully was born in New York City, and there attended Cathedral College and St. Joseph's Seminary in Yonkers. He also studied at The Catholic University of America in Washington, D.C. He was ordained to the priesthood on September 20, 1919. He then served as a curate and afterwards pastor at Sacred Heart of Jesus Church in New York City. He was also pastor of St. Mary's Church in Troy for nine years. He became Secretary of Education for the Archdiocese of New York in 1940. He was named a Domestic Prelate in 1941.

On August 21, 1945, Scully was appointed Coadjutor Bishop of Albany and Titular Bishop of Pharsalus by Pope Pius XII. He received his episcopal consecration on the following October 24 from Bishop Edmund Gibbons, with Bishops Thomas Edmund Molloy and Bryan Joseph McEntegart serving as co-consecrators. Following the resignation of Bishop Gibbons, Scully succeeded him as the seventh Bishop of Albany on November 10, 1954. In 1955 he founded an annual appeal for funds to support diocesan education and welfare programs. He established a total of thirteen parishes, twenty-one elementary schools, six high schools and expanded two others, a nursing home, and Maria College. He also headed the New York State Catholic Welfare Committee and the Catholic Charities division of the National Catholic Welfare Council. In 1963 he was forced to return from the Second Vatican Council due to fatigue. He delegated the active administration of the diocese to an auxiliary bishop in 1966.

Scully died from bronchial pneumonia at St. Peter's Hospital in Albany, aged 74. Governor Nelson Rockefeller described his death as "a grievous loss—not only to those of his faith but to all of us in New York State."

References

1894 births
1969 deaths
Participants in the Second Vatican Council
Roman Catholic bishops of Albany
Saint Joseph's Seminary (Dunwoodie) alumni
Catholic University of America alumni
20th-century Roman Catholic bishops in the United States